James Alfred Roosevelt (June 13, 1825 – July 15, 1898) was an American businessman and philanthropist.  A member of the Roosevelt family, he was an uncle of President Theodore Roosevelt.

Early life
Roosevelt was born on June 13, 1825, to Cornelius Van Schaack Roosevelt (1794–1871) and Margaret Barnhill (1799–1861).  His siblings were Silas Weir Roosevelt (1823–1870), Cornelius Van Schaack Roosevelt, Jr., Robert Barnhill Roosevelt (1829–1906), Theodore Roosevelt, Sr. (1831–1878), who was married to Martha "Mittie" Bulloch (1835–1884), and William Wallace Roosevelt (1834–1835).

Career
Roosevelt became a member of his father's mercantile firm, Roosevelt & Son, at the age of twenty, and eventually succeeded him as its head. He was connected with many other institutions, including as vice president of the Chemical Bank of New York; president of the Broadway Improvement Company; vice president of the Bank of Savings; member of the board of managers of the Delaware and Hudson Canal Company; director of the New York Life Insurance Trust.

He was a trustee to the Society for Prevention of Cruelty to Children and on the New York Board of Park Commissioners during the William Lafayette Strong Administration. He was a president of Roosevelt Hospital that was founded by his distant cousin James H. Roosevelt.

Personal life
On December 22, 1847, he married Elizabeth Norris Emlen (1825–1912), the daughter of William Fishbourne Emlen (1786–1866) and Mary Parker Norris (1791–1872).  Together, they had four children, including:

 Mary Emlen Roosevelt (1848–1885)
 Leila Roosevelt (1850–1934), who married Edward Reeve Merritt (1850–1931).
 Alfred Roosevelt (1856–1891), who married Katherine Lowell (1858–1925) in 1882.
 William Emlen Roosevelt (1857–1930), who married Christine Griffin Kean (1858–1936) in 1883.

He died on July 15, 1898 near Mineola, New York while riding a train on his way home to Oyster Bay, New York.

Descendants
Through his son, Alfred, he was the grandfather of Elfrida Roosevelt, who married Sir Orme Bigland Clarke, 4th Baronet, and was the mother of Sir Humphrey Clarke, 5th Baronet.

References

Sources

James
Schuyler family
1825 births
1898 deaths
People from Oyster Bay (town), New York
Philanthropists from New York (state)
19th-century American businesspeople